Fudbalski klub Borac Čačak (Serbian Cyrillic: Фудбалски клуб Борац Чачак), or simply Borac Čačak, is a professional football club based in Čačak, Serbia. The word Borac in translation means fighter in English. Mainly because of the horizontally placed stripes, Borac's nickname is Zebre (Zebras). During the 2014/15 campaign they will be competing in the Serbian SuperLiga and Serbian Cup.

Competitions

Serbian SuperLiga

Serbian Cup

External links
 FK Borac Čačak official website. 
 uefa.com - UEFA.com
 Club profile and squad at Srbijafudbal
 Team profile at JelenFootball
 Borac Stats at Utakmica.rs

FK Borac Čačak
Borac Cacak